Eupithecia dearmata is a moth in the family Geometridae. It is found in Turkey. Adults have dull grey wings with a large number of scattered dark scales and a wing span of 14–15 mm.

Taxonomy
The species was originally described by Karl Dietze in genus Eupithecia, though he mentioned the possibility that it might instead belong to genus Gymnoscelis, to which it was later transferred. In 2013, it was however restored to its original genus by Vladimir Mironov, whose placement has been followed by subsequent authors.

References

Moths described in 1904
Eupithecia
Insects of Turkey